Abdallah Deerow Isaaq (1950 – 2006), sometimes Abdullah Deerow Isaq, was a Somali politician. He served as the first Speaker of Parliament in the Transitional National Government of Somalia from 2000 to 2003, and was later the Minister of Constitutional and Federal Affairs in the Transitional Federal Government. He was assassinated in July 2006.

Political career
Deerow is a member of the Rahaweyn clan and was a representative of that clan at the 2000 Somalia National Peace Conference (the Djibouti Conference). He was elected as the Speaker of the parliament in the Transitional National Government (TNG) on August 20, 2000. As speaker, he presided over the election of Abdiqasim Salad Hassan as TNG President at the Djibouti Conference.

In August 2003, Deerow was dismissed as Speaker of the parliamentary assembly, a decision which he maintained was illegitimate because the TNG's mandate had already ended earlier in the month. In 2004, he was named Minister of Constitutional and Federal Affairs in the TNG's successor, the Transitional Federal Government (TFG), by President Abdullahi Yusuf Ahmed.

Assassination
On July 28, 2006, as Deerow left Friday prayers from a mosque in Baidoa, which was at the time the temporary seat of the TFG, a lone gunman shot him dead. Riots subsequently erupted in the city streets in protest of the killing. In response, the authorities began a security crackdown.

Notes

References
 
 

1950 births
2006 deaths
Assassinated Somalian politicians
People murdered in Somalia
Government ministers of Somalia
Speakers of the Parliament of Somalia
2006 murders in Somalia